James E. "Jim" Nevels is an American business executive, entrepreneur, and philanthropist. As a businessman, he is known as the founder of The Swarthmore Group. He is the former Chairman of The Federal Reserve Bank of Philadelphia and former Chairman of the Board of The Hershey Company.

Early life 
Nevels was born in Alabama.

Nevels earned a scholarship to study at Bucknell University.
and graduated with an AB degree He earned his MBA from Wharton School of the University of Pennsylvania
and his Juris Doctor from the University of Pennsylvania in 1978.

Business career

Wall Street 
Nevels was recruited by a client of the law firm and moved to work on Wall Street.

The Swarthmore Group 
Nevels started The Swarthmore Group in November 1991. His first client was the City of Birmingham, Alabama. 

The Swarthmore Group closed in June 2022 and filed for Chapter 7 bankruptcy protection in August 2022.

Business Council For International Understanding (BCIU) 
Nevels was appointed chair of the Business Council For International Understanding in June 2021.

Board Roles 
Nevels has been involved with following boards/organizations:

 Appointed by the President George W. Bush to the Advisory Committee to the Pension Benefit Guaranty Corporation, he was Chairman from 2005 until 2007.
 Appointed by the Governor of Pennsylvania as Chairman of the Philadelphia School Reform Commission, served through September 2007.
 Member of the Board of The Federal Reserve Bank of Philadelphia from 2010 to 2015
 Deputy Chairman of the Board of The Federal Reserve Bank of Philadelphia from January 2012 through January 2014.
 Chair of the Board of The Federal Reserve Bank of Philadelphia from January 2014 through December 2015.
 Board Member, Renew Financial LLC 
 Chairman, Business Council for International Understanding (BCIU) June 2021–present
 Board member, Alcoa Corporation from November 2016.
 Board Member, Meadwestvaco June 2014–July 2015
 Board Member, Westrock January 2015–present
 Chairman, The Swarthmore Group November 1991–2022
 Board Member, Pro Football Hall of Fame 
 Board Member, First Data Corp November 2014–July 2019
 Board Member, XL Group October 2017–September/2018
 Lead Independent Director, The Hershey Company April 2015–May 2017
 Chairman, The Hershey Company February 2009–April 2015
 Board Member, Hershey Trust Company January 2007–December 2009
 Chairman, Hershey Trust Company January 2009–December 2015
 Lead Director, Hershey Trust Company January 2015–unknown
 Board Member, Tasty Baking Company May 2005–May 2011
 Board Member, Hershey Company November 2007–February 2009
 Chairman Pension Benefit Guaranty Company January 2005–December 2007
 Board Member, Milton Hershey School Trust January 2007–unknown
 Board Member, MMG Insurance Company January 2014–unknown
 Manor College Board of Trustees.
 Former Board Member, Marine Corps Heritage Foundation 
 Former Board Member, The Barbara Bush Foundation for Family Literacy Inc

Personal life 
Jim Nevels is married to Dr. Lourene Ann Dellinger Nevels. They have no children. Dr. Nevels is a licensed psychologist in private practice, director of a university counseling center, a college professor and published author of children's books and books on psychology.

Philanthropy

Bucknell University 
Nevels and his wife, both class of 1974, endowed the Robert Gross scholarship.

Manor College 
Nevels and his wife, donated to the Manor College Veterinary Technology Program.

References

External links 
  Swarthmore Group web site

Federal Reserve Bank people
University of Pennsylvania Law School alumni
Wharton School of the University of Pennsylvania alumni
Bucknell University alumni
Businesspeople from Alabama
Living people
Year of birth missing (living people)